Birmingham Country Club

Birmingham Country Club (Alabama)
Birmingham Country Club (Michigan)